Robert Lacey Crook (April 22, 1929 – January 26, 2011) was an American politician from Mississippi.

Early life and education
Robert Lacey Crook was born in Bolton, Mississippi and grew up in Ruleville, Mississippi. He served in the United States Marine Corps during World War II. Crook went to the University of Mississippi, the Mississippi College School of Law, and then practiced law.

Career
Crook served in the Mississippi State Senate from 1964 to 1992 and was a Democrat. He served as chairman of the Senate Fees and Salaries Committee for 20 years, setting policy on compensation for state and local officials.

Crook died from undisclosed causes at his home in Jackson, Mississippi at the age of 81.

Personal life
Crook had a wife, two sons, and a grandson.

References

1929 births
2011 deaths
Democratic Party Mississippi state senators
Politicians from Jackson, Mississippi
People from Bolton, Mississippi
People from Ruleville, Mississippi
Military personnel from Mississippi
University of Mississippi alumni
Mississippi College School of Law alumni
Lawyers from Jackson, Mississippi
20th-century American lawyers